This is a list of finalists for the 1990 Archibald Prize for portraiture (listed is Artist – Title).

Prize winners 
The 1990 Archibald Prize winners were:

 Geoffrey Proud – Dorothy Hewett (Winner of the Archibald Prize) image
 Reg Campbell – Self-portrait (Winner of The People's Choice Award)

Finalists 
The finalists were:

 Davida Allen – hey, Betty – Portrait of Betty Churcher
 Marcus Beilby – Hal Missingham
 Robert Campbell Junior – Sammy Alfie Drew, local Macleay Aboriginal sporting identity (football and cricket)
 Reg Campbell – Self-portrait (Winner: The People's Choice Award)
 Judy Cassab – Portrait of Jeff Smart
 Kevin Connor – Portrait of Margaret Connor
 Fred Cress – The Working Day (Len Evans)
 Brian Dunlop – Tony Irving (artist and geometer)
 Geoffrey Dupree – Mike (Portrait of Mike Hamilton, writer and journalist)
 Steve Gorton – Leigh Johnson
 Hadyn Wilson and students of the Julian Ashton School – Portrait of Paul Delprat image
 Bill Hay – Darren Knight, Art Bookmaker
 Glenda Jones – Kaz Cooke image
 Kerrie Lester – Colleen Clifford
 Wendy Li – Eunice Gardner F.R.A.M.
 Geoffrey Lowe – Irene Bolger a drawing
 Lewis Miller – Portrait of Ray Hughes
 Mary Pace – Self-portrait image
 Geoffrey Proud – Dorothy Hewett (Winner: Archibald Prize 1990) image
 Aileen Rogers – Dr Susi Erika Phillips, Specialist in Child Development
 Jenny Sages – Adele Weiss and Benjamin
 Jenny Sands – Portrait of Alexandra Karpin
 Eric John Smith – Hector Gilliland
 David Thomas – Pain in the Art, Portrait of Claire St. Claire
 Imants Tillers – Portrait of Murray Bail 1990
 Rosemary Valadon – One flesh ll – portrait of Frances Joseph (sculptor) and son image
 David Van Nunen – Self-portrait of the artist at Litchfield Park
 Wes Walters – Kenneth Myer
 Anna Wojak – Pan Tanca
 Salvatore Zofrea – Psalm 44: after Uccello – self-portrait
 Susanne de Berenger – Margaret Fink image

See also 

 Previous year: List of Archibald Prize 1989 finalists
 Next year: List of Archibald Prize 1991/92 finalists
 List of Archibald Prize winners
 Lists of Archibald Prize finalists

References 

1990
Archibald Prize 1990
Archibald Prize 1990
1990 in art
Arch